Duke of York Rural LLG is a local-level government (LLG) that comprises the Duke of York Islands in East New Britain Province, Papua New Guinea.

Wards
01. Makada/Nagaila
02. Molot
03. Maren
04. Butlivuan
05. Waira
06. Nabual
07. Inolo
08. Kumaina
09. Kabilomo
10. Urakukur
11. Kababiai
12. Mualim
13. Virian
14. Palpal
15. Utuan
16. Karawara
17. Mioko
18. Urukuk
19. Pirtop
20. Nakukur No.1 & 2
21. Rakanda

References

Local-level governments of East New Britain Province